A foss is a waterfall.

Foss or FOSS may further refer to:

Companies
Foss A/S, a Danish analytical instrument company
Foss Brewery, a former brewery in Oslo, Norway
Foss Maritime, a tugboat and shipping company

Historic houses
Foss House (New Brighton, Minnesota), United States 
Foss and Wells House, Jordan, Minnesota, United States 
Horatio G. Foss House, Auburn, Maine, United States

People
Foss (surname)
Foss Shanahan (1910–1964), New Zealand diplomat
Foss Westcott (1863–1949), English bishop

Places
Foss Dyke, a canal in Lincolnshire, England
Foss-Eikeland, a village in Sandnes, Norway
River Foss, a river in North Yorkshire, England, U.K.

United States
Foss, Oklahoma, a town
Foss State Park
Foss, Oregon, an unincorporated community 
Foss Glacier, a glacier on Mount Hinman, Washington
Foss Peak, Tatoosh Range, Washington
Foss River, a river in Washington

Other uses
Foss (band), an El Paso, Texas-based rock band
Foss (cat), the pet of Edward Lear
Free and open-source software (FOSS)
FOSS Movement in India (1990s–2000s), a campaign in India to promote Free and Open Source Software
FOSS.IN (2001–2012), an annual FOSS conference in Bangalore, India
Full Option Science System (FOSS), a science curriculum
Il-Foss, a football ground in Ħaż-Żabbar, Malta
, a US Navy ship
Foss Gly, a character from Clive Cussler novels Night Probe! and Cyclops

See also

Fosse (disambiguation)
Fosses (disambiguation)